Dolichognatha richardi is a species of long-jawed orb weaver in the spider family Tetragnathidae. It is found in Samoa.

References

Tetragnathidae
Articles created by Qbugbot
Spiders described in 1955